Burks House, is a log cabin with a mud-daub chimney built in 1883. The house is typical of those built in the 19th century when the area was officially open to homesteading.

The cabin was moved to its present location in 1983, completely restored, and was enlisted on the National Register of Historic Places on September 8, 1987. It is the only authentic log cabin in Beauregard Parish.

References

See also
National Register of Historic Places listings in Beauregard Parish, Louisiana

Houses on the National Register of Historic Places in Louisiana
Houses completed in 1883
Houses in Beauregard Parish, Louisiana
National Register of Historic Places in Beauregard Parish, Louisiana